Nerea Ahedo Ceza (March 31, 1966) is a Spanish politician who is a member of the Basque Nationalist Party (PNV). She was born in Bilbao, and has been a senator for Vizcaya since December 20, 2015, in the eleventh and twelfth legislatures.

References 

Basque women in politics
1966 births
Living people
Politicians from Bilbao
Basque Nationalist Party politicians
Members of the 11th Senate of Spain
Members of the 12th Senate of Spain
Members of the 13th Senate of Spain
Members of the 14th Senate of Spain